

This is a list of the National Register of Historic Places listings in  Marion County, Indiana.

This is intended to be a complete list of the properties and districts on the National Register of Historic Places in Marion County, Indiana, United States. Latitude and longitude coordinates are provided for many National Register properties and districts; these locations may be seen together in a map.

There are 261 properties and districts listed on the National Register in the county, including 9 National Historic Landmarks. Because Indianapolis is coextensive with Marion County, properties are listed by township rather than by city or town. Center Township is the location of 188 of these properties and districts, including 6 of the National Historic Landmarks; these properties and districts are listed separately. Properties and districts in Marion County's other townships are listed here. One district, the Indianapolis Park and Boulevard System, is primarily in Center Township but extends into three other townships, and is therefore included on both lists. Nine other properties, including seven in Center Township, were once listed but have since been removed.

Current listings

|}

Former listings

|}

See also
 
 List of National Historic Landmarks in Indiana
 National Register of Historic Places listings in Indiana
 Listings in neighboring counties: Boone, Hamilton, Hancock, Hendricks, Johnson, Morgan, Shelby
 List of Indiana state historical markers in Marion County

References

 
Marion County